Higashiueda Dam is a gravity dam located in Gifu Prefecture in Japan. The dam is used for power production. The catchment area of the dam is 770 km2. The dam impounds about 21  ha of land when full and can store 1065 thousand cubic meters of water. The construction of the dam was started on 1952 and completed in 1954.

References

Dams in Gifu Prefecture
1954 establishments in Japan